Lea railway station was a station in Lea, Lincolnshire, England, south of Gainsborough. It was opened in 1849 by the Great Northern Railway, but was closed to passengers in 1957 and closed entirely in 1963.

References

Disused railway stations in Lincolnshire
Former Great Northern and Great Eastern Joint Railway stations
Railway stations in Great Britain opened in 1849
Railway stations in Great Britain closed in 1864
Railway stations in Great Britain opened in 1867
Railway stations in Great Britain closed in 1957
1849 establishments in England
1957 disestablishments in England